Kyriaki Kouvari (born January 19, 1984, in Thessaloniki) is a Greek taekwondo practitioner. She won the bronze medal for the heavyweight category at the 2003 World Taekwondo Championships in Garmisch-Partenkirchen, Germany.

Kouvari competed for the women's heavyweight category (+67 kg) at the 2008 Summer Olympics in Beijing, after defeating Great Britain's Sarah Stevenson for the gold medal at the World Qualification Tournament in Manchester, England. She lost the first preliminary match by a defensive kick from Brazil's Natália Falavigna, with a score of 1–3.

References

External links

NBC 2008 Olympics profile

1984 births
Living people
Greek female taekwondo practitioners
Olympic taekwondo practitioners of Greece
Taekwondo practitioners at the 2008 Summer Olympics
Sportspeople from Thessaloniki
World Taekwondo Championships medalists
21st-century Greek women